Hygrotus is a genus of beetle in family Dytiscidae. It contains two subgenera (Coelambus and Hygrotus) and about 70 species, including:

 Hygrotus acaroides (LeConte, 1855)
 Hygrotus aequalis Falkenström, 1932
 Hygrotus ahmeti Hájek, Fery & Erman, 2005
 Hygrotus armeniacus (Zaitzev, 1927)
 Hygrotus artus (Fall, 1919)
 Hygrotus berneri Young & Wolfe, 1984
 Hygrotus bruesi (Fall, 1928)
 Hygrotus caspius (Wehncke, 1875)
 Hygrotus chinensis (Sharp, 1882)
 Hygrotus collatus (Fall, 1919)
 Hygrotus compar (Fall, 1919)
 Hygrotus confluens (Fabricius, 1787)
 Hygrotus corpulentus (Schaum, 1864)
 Hygrotus cribrarius (Scudder, 1900)
 Hygrotus curvilobus Fery, Sadeghi & Hosseinie, 2005
 Hygrotus curvipes (Leech, 1938)
 Hygrotus decoratus (Gyllenhal, 1810)
 Hygrotus derelictus (Scudder, 1900)
 Hygrotus disjectus (Scudder, 1900)
 Hygrotus dissimilis (Gemminger & Harold, 1868)
 Hygrotus diversipes Leech, 1966
 Hygrotus dzieduszyckii (Lomnicki, 1894)
 Hygrotus enneagrammus (Ahrens, 1833)
 Hygrotus falli (Wallis, 1924)
 Hygrotus farctus (LeConte, 1855)
 Hygrotus femoratus (Fall, 1901)
 Hygrotus flaviventris (Motschulsky, 1860)
 Hygrotus fontinalis Leech, 1966
 Hygrotus fraternus (LeConte, 1852)
 Hygrotus fresnedai (Fery, 1992)
 Hygrotus fumatus (Sharp, 1882)
 Hygrotus ganglbaueri (Lomnicki, 1894)
 Hygrotus hydropicus (LeConte, 1852)
 Hygrotus impressopunctatus (Schaller, 1783)
 Hygrotus inaequalis (Fabricius, 1777)
 Hygrotus infernalis (Scudder, 1900)
 Hygrotus infuscatus (Sharp, 1882)
 Hygrotus inscriptus (Sharp, 1882)
 Hygrotus intermedius (Fall, 1919)
 Hygrotus laccophilinus (LeConte, 1878)
 Hygrotus lagari (Fery, 1992)
 Hygrotus latefasciatus (Lomnicki, 1894)
 Hygrotus lernaeus (Schaum, 1857)
 Hygrotus lutescens (LeConte, 1852)
 Hygrotus marginipennis (Blatchley, 1912)
 Hygrotus marklini (Gyllenhal, 1813)
 Hygrotus masculinus (Crotch, 1874)
 Hygrotus miocenus (Wickham, 1912)
 Hygrotus niedzwiedzkii (Lomnicki, 1894)
 Hygrotus nigrescens (Fall, 1919)
 Hygrotus nigrolineatus (Steven, 1808)
 Hygrotus novemlineatus (Stephens, 1829)
 Hygrotus nubilus (LeConte, 1855)
 Hygrotus obscureplagiatus (Fall, 1919)
 Hygrotus orthogrammus (Sharp, 1882)
 Hygrotus ozokeriticus (Lomnicki, 1894)
 Hygrotus pallidulus (Aubé, 1850)
 Hygrotus parallellogrammus (Ahrens, 1812)
 Hygrotus patruelis (LeConte, 1855)
 Hygrotus pectoralis (Motschulsky, 1860)
 Hygrotus pedalis (Fall, 1901)
 Hygrotus picatus (Kirby, 1837)
 Hygrotus picipoides (Lomnicki, 1894)
 Hygrotus polonicus (Aubé, 1842)
 Hygrotus punctilineatus (Fall, 1919)
 Hygrotus quinquelineatus (Zetterstedt, 1828)
 Hygrotus saginatus (Schaum, 1857)
 Hygrotus salinarius (Wallis, 1924)
 Hygrotus sanfilippoi (Fery, 1992)
 Hygrotus sayi J.Balfour-Browne, 1944
 Hygrotus sellatus (LeConte, 1866)
 Hygrotus semenowi (Jakovlev, 1899)
 Hygrotus semivittatus (Fall, 1919)
 Hygrotus stefanschoedli Fery, Sadeghi & Hosseinie, 2005
 Hygrotus suturalis (LeConte, 1850)
 Hygrotus sylvanus (Fall, 1917)
 Hygrotus thermarum (Darlington, 1928)
 Hygrotus tumidiventris (Fall, 1919)
 Hygrotus turbidus (LeConte, 1855)
 Hygrotus unguicularis (Crotch, 1874)
 Hygrotus urgensis (Jakovlev, 1899)
 Hygrotus versicolor (Schaller, 1783)
 Hygrotus wardii (Clark, 1862)
 Hygrotus zigetangco Fery, 2003

References

 
Dytiscidae genera
Taxonomy articles created by Polbot